Super Singh is a 2017 Indian Punjabi-language superhero comedy and action film written and directed by Anurag Singh. It has main starrings of actors Diljit Dosanjh, Sonam Bajwa and Alexandra Bandean. The film is a mix of comedy and action. It was filmed in Montreal, Canada, and in India. Super Singh was released worldwide on 16 June 2017.  It marked the fifth collaboration between Diljit Dosanjh and director Anurag Singh.

Plot

Super Singh is the story of Sajjan Singh (Diljit Dosanjh), a Punjabi man who resides in Canada with his mother. Circumstances bring him back to his hometown in Punjab, where he accidentally attains superpowers and sets off on a path of self realisation.

Initially, in Canada, Sajjan is a spoilt guy who only wanted to seek pleasure and wants to impress his love (a girl from Canada) but is secretly loved by his childhood friend. When her mother comes to Canada accidentally exchanges the turban with a guy trying to escape death...when Sajjan, who renamed himself Sam just to mix with foreigners, tries to impress Cathy through a game of rugby but is feared that he will be beaten up by her boyfriend in the game. Sajjan, not realizing first, strangely beats them and finds that he has got some super powers.

After days of trying to find out the cause of his power, it finally came that lasted only one day when he was going to cut his hair for Cathy and realises with the help of his friend happy that a turban was the cause of his power. He then decided to stop thinking of Cathy as she finds his culture inferior and helps others to realise all who Singh's are and thus becomes Super Singh.
After many incidents and struggles, he defeats a fake guru, the Dass  and saves Shree Darbar Sahib from a missile fired by Dass. Then after saving the day, he meets a fake looking web slinger and gossips with him a lot and finds out that it was an actor (played by Sharry Mann himself) who was just acting out for some reasons.

Cast

 Diljit Dosanjh as Sajjan Singh/ Sam/ Super Singh
 Sonam Bajwa as Twinkle
 Pavan Malhotra as Saint
 Rana Ranbir
 Alexandra Bandean as Cathy
 Meherban Singh
 Navnindra Behl
 Alexandre Brassard
 Survinder Vicky
 Sharry Mann, guest appearance as Spider-Man

Development

According to Diljit Dosanjh, the idea to make a Punjabi superhero film came to him after the release of Jatt and Juliet in the year 2012 when he saw an image of himself superimposed on the body of Superman by someone on the internet. Due to the expensive budget of the film, it took Diljit and Anurag Singh, the director of the film, nearly two years to find a Producer for the movie. It was only after Ekta Kapoor's Balaji Motion Pictures came on board as a Producer was this project given the green light. Super Singh marks the fifth collaboration of actor Diljit Dosanjh and director Anurag Singh after Jatt & Juliet, Jatt & Juliet 2, Punjab 1984 and Disco Singh, and is the maiden Punjabi production of Ekta Kapoor. The first look of the film was unveiled by Balaji Motion Pictures on 17 January 2017.

Soundtrack 

The soundtrack of Super Singh was composed by Jatinder Shah. The lyrics were written by Ranbir Singh & Veet Baljit.

Reception

Box office

The film opened at around 1100 screens worldwide. Widest for a Punjabi film. It was released alongside Cars 3 (in India) and Bank Chor.

Critical reception

Divya Pal of News18 praised the performance of Diljit Dosanjh, giving it a rating of 2.5 stars out of 5 and saying, "Director Singh deserves credit for thinking different, aiming high to surprise viewers, but this time out, it doesn't quite come together. The reason? There is no freshness in the script. All in all, predictable plot and safe script, dilutes the impact of the film." Manjusha Radhakrishnan of Gulf News gave the film a rating of 2 stars out of 5, and said, "While it's sweet at first, it gets cloyingly virtuous toward the second half. A predictable story line and stereotypical villains make it a tedious watch." The Hindustan Times gave the film a rating of 2 stars out of 5, saying, "Diljit comes across as somewhat anxious in his efforts to woo audiences in his new avatar. The performance lacks the effortlessness of Udta Punjab. The special effects are cringe-worthy, and when Diljit flies, he looks like Ashok Kumar marching across the army base in a comatose condition in Manoj Kumar's Clerk." Jyoti Sharma Bawa of The Indian Express praised the humour of the film saying, "Diljit Dosanjh film is a goofball comedy and a superhero caper all rolled into one. What it lacks in script and CGI, it more than makes up in jokes and Diljit's easy charm." and gave the film a rating of 3 stars out of 5.

References

External links

Punjabi-language Indian films
2010s Punjabi-language films
Films scored by Jatinder Shah
2010s Indian superhero films
Indian action comedy films
Balaji Motion Pictures films
Films about Sikhism
Films directed by Anurag Singh
2017 action comedy films
Indian superhero films